Västgöta Nation, commonly known as Västgöta or VG, is one of the thirteen student nations of Uppsala University, originally intended for students from Västergötland Province. It was founded in 1639 and thus is Uppsala's oldest nation. With about 1 200 members Västgöta Nation is one of the smaller nations at Uppsala but still has extensive cultural activities including three choirs, a theatre club and an orchestra.

The nation's building (Swedish: nationshus) lies along the Fyrisån and was probably built in 1604, though its cellar is much older. The building survived a citywide fire in 1702, unusually for central Uppsala. Amongst the building's former owners was Field Marshal Lennart Torstenson, and it has been in the nation's possession since 1825.

Activities
The nation divides its activities into two main categories, culture and the 'club-office' (Swedish: klubbverket). Cultural activities include choirs (mixed choir, men's choir and ladies choir), theatre club, orchestra and sports club. The second category includes gasques, the pub Djäknen, the fortnightly restaurant KäK, daily vegan soup lunch and weekend fika.

Club office
A gasque is traditional formal student dinner followed by an afterparty known as a släpp. In the autumn term these usually include a Kräftgasque (crayfish gasque), Reccegasque (freshmen's gasque), Damsupé (ladies' dinner), Herrmiddag (gentlemen's dinner) and Luciagasque (Saint Lucia's Day dinner). The autumn's biggest event is a ball called the Gåsmiddag or goose dinner, celebrated near Saint Martin's Day. The winter/spring term usually includes Reccegasque, a Kulturgasque (culture-gasque), Damsupé, Herrmiddag and Majmiddag (May dinner). The biggest events are clustered around Walpurgis Night, including Tirolborg and the Vårbal (spring ball).

Djäknen is the nation's pub, located in the oldest part of the nation's building, the mediaeval cellar.

Friend Nations
Västgöta nation, Lund
Nylands Nation, Helsinki
Keskisuomalainen Osakunta, Helsinki

Inspektors 
In 1663 Ericus Odhelius, professor of theology, became the nation's first inspektor. Bertil Wiman, professor of swedish Law and Taxes is the current inspector.

 Västgöta nation

Nations at Uppsala University
Student organizations established in the 17th century